Events in the year 1994 in Switzerland.

Incumbents
Federal Council:
Otto Stich (President)
Jean-Pascal Delamuraz 
Kaspar Villiger
Arnold Koller 
Flavio Cotti 
Ruth Dreifuss
Adolf Ogi

Births

 5 January - Jolanda Neff, cyclist
 17 January - Tom Bohli, cyclist
 26 January - Salim Khelifi, footballer
 6 March - Armin Alesevic, footballer
 14 March - Leonardo Bertone, footballer
 24 March - Giulia Steingruber, artistic gymnast
 27 March - Birama Ndoye, footballer
 31 July - Florent Hadergjonaj, footballer
 8 October - Luca Hänni, Swiss singer and winner of Deutschland sucht den Superstar (season 9)
 Zoé Metthez, model and beauty pageant titleholder

Deaths

 10 March - Roger Bocquet, footballer
 15 September - Ernst Fuchs, cyclist

Treaties

International Tropical Timber Agreement, 1994.

Establishments

FC Breitenrain Bern.

References

 
Years of the 20th century in Switzerland
1990s in Switzerland
Switzerland